Achkan also known as Baghal bandi is a knee length jacket worn by men in the Indian subcontinent much like the Angarkha.

History
Achkan evolved from Chapkan, a dress  which earlier formed the costume of the respectable class. According to Shrar, Achkan was invented in Lucknow when India was being ruled by independent rulers (rajas, nawabs and Nizams). It was later adopted by high class Hindus from Muslim nobles

It can be distinguished from the Sherwani through various aspects, particularly the front opening. Achkan traditionally has side-opening tied with strings, this style of opening is known as baghal bandi but frontal opening were not uncommon, similar to Angarkha. While sherwani always has straight frontal opening, due to its function as outer-coat. Achkan, like Angarkha was traditionally worn with sash known as patka, kamarband or dora wrapped around the waist to keep the entire costume in place. While sherwani was traditionally worn as decorative outer-coat for special occasions during medieval times. Achkan is always worn with either dhoti or churidar. Achkan is made from various fabrics for both formal and informal occasions, it features traditional embroidery like gota and badla. Today, achkan is commonly worn by the grooms during wedding ceremonies or other formal festive occasions in the Indian subcontinent. It was used by men.

There are various regional variations of achkan worn throughout the Indian subcontinent, and are known by regional names such as Daura in Nepal and Northeast India, Angi in Southern India and Chola or Cholu in Indian Himalayas.

In the Indian subcontinent, the achkan is generally worn for formal occasions in winter, especially by those from Punjab, Jammu, Rajasthan, Delhi, Uttar Pradesh and Hyderabad. The achkan sherwani is generally associated with the Hindus while the sherwani was historically favoured by Muslims. The two garments have significant similarities, though sherwanis typically are more flared at the hips and achkans are lengthier than sherwanis. The achkan later evolved into the Nehru Jacket, which is popular in India.

References

Pakistani clothing
Punjabi clothing